Xerovounos is an abandoned village located in the Nicosia District of Cyprus, west of Karavostasi. De facto, it is under the control of Northern Cyprus. Between 1958 and 1975, it was called  in Turkish.

References

 
Communities in Nicosia District
Populated places in Lefke District